WMOG (910 AM) is a radio station broadcasting an Urban Gospel format. Licensed to Meridian, Mississippi, United States, the station is owned by Clay Holladay, through licensee Mississippi Broadcasters.

History
The station first went on the air as WCOC in 1927 from Columbus, Mississippi and was owned by the Crystal Oil Company. It was moved to Meridian in 1929.

As WOKK, the station had a country format until 1983 when it swapped with WALT to FM 97.3 MHz. WALT carried a Hot AC format until 1985, when the format changed to Urban Contemporary and its moniker became T-91 and it broadcast in AM Stereo.

WALT changed to a talk radio format. On August 20, 2010, WALT began simulcasting on WALT-FM 102.1 MHz. In 2019, WALT broke off simulcasting Talk with WALT-FM and flipped to Urban Gospel as Praise 910 AM.

The station changed its call sign to WMOG on March 16, 2020.

External links
Praise 910 AM Facebook Page

MOG (AM)
Radio stations established in 1927
1927 establishments in Mississippi
Gospel radio stations in the United States
The Radio People radio stations